Wade Rowland is a Canadian science, technology, and history writer. He is currently a lecturer at York University.

Biography
Rowland was born in Montreal, Quebec in 1944.  He was married in 1978 to Christine Collie, with whom he has two children, Simon and Hilary Rowland.

Rowland has worked as a journalist for the Winnipeg Free Press, the Toronto Telegram, and Canadian television networks CBC and CTV.  He holds a Ph.D. from Toronto's York University. He has lectured at Trent University in Peterborough, Ontario, and is a former Maclean Hunter Chair of Ethics in Communication at Ryerson University, Toronto. He is currently a professor of communications at York University. He has resided in Port Hope, Ontario since 1982.

Galileo's Mistake

Books

References

External links
Wade Rowland's official website
Wade Rowland's blog

Anglophone Quebec people
Canadian male novelists
Living people
Writers from Montreal
People from Northumberland County, Ontario
1944 births
York University alumni
Academic staff of Trent University
Academic staff of Toronto Metropolitan University
Academic staff of York University
Canadian male non-fiction writers